Demeo is a 2021 tabletop-themed survival role-playing video game game developed and published by Resolution Games. The game was originally a virtual reality game. It was released on the Oculus Quest, and will be released for PlayStation 5 via the PlayStation VR2 headset in 2023.

Gameplay
Demeo borrows from classic tabletop games Magic: The Gathering and Dungeons and Dragons. The main objective is to get to the "Nevermost Catacombs" and defeat the enemy there. This requires clearing the floor of the "Elvian Necropolis". On each floor a monster holds the key to the floor exit to get to the next floor. The four available heroes are The Guardian, The Assassin, The Sorcerer, and The Hunter, each with their own abilities. The two modes are Skirmish and Multiplayer. In Skirmish Mode the player controls up to three characters. Play is turn-based meaning each character gets a turn to attack. After the turn is over the enemy gets to attack. Each player is given two action points for each turn that they then can choose to use. Actions include Spells, Special Attacks, and Items, all represented by cards. Cards include Banish, which can teleport enemies, Barricade to protect from an enemy, and the Repeating Ballista which shoots three bolts each turn at an enemy until dies.

Players can visit an in-game shop tilted "Cleptos Bazzar" where they can buy cards to add to their deck.

Up to four players can play Demeo, with each player controlling a Hero, playing in turn.

Development
The game was developed and published by Resolution Games. After the launch, Resolution Games announced a road-map for more content. This content included "Roots of Evil", a new place for players to hangout titled "Players Hangout", and a PC edition.

Reception

Demeo received "generally favorable reviews" according to review aggregator Metacritic.

References 

2021 video games
Meta Quest games
PlayStation 5 games
PlayStation VR2 games
Virtual reality games